New Ideas from Dead Economists, written by Todd G. Buchholz, is an introduction to the history and development of modern economic thought, originally published in 1989. Since its original publication, there have been two revisions, the most recent of which was published in 2021. In the foreword, Martin Feldstein writes:

In this book, Todd Buchholz provides a intelligible introduction to the key ideas of economics through the study of the great economists who have shaped the discipline. Instead of the formal models and complex diagrams that are the focus of standard economics textbooks, Buchholz provides clear, nontechnical explanations and timely examples.

Chapter headings
Introduction: The Plight of the Economist
The Second Coming of Adam Smith
Malthus: Prophet of Doom and Population Boom
David Ricardo and the Cry for Free Trade
The Stormy Mind of John Stuart Mill
The Angry Oracle Called Karl Marx
Alfred Marshall and the Marginalist Mind
Old and New Institutionalists
Keynes: Bon Vivant as Savior
The Monetarist Battle Against Keynes
The Public Choice School: Politics as a Business
The Wild World of Rational Expectations
Dark Clouds, Silver Linings

References 

1989 non-fiction books
Books about the history of economic thought